The 2008–09 season was the 52nd season in RK Zamet’s history. It is their 1st successive season in the Dukat Premier League, and 32nd successive top tier season.

First team squad

Goalkeeper
 1  Damir Bobanović
 12  Ivan Karabatić
 16  Marin Đurica

Wingers
RW
 4  Davor Vukelić
 6  Dario Černeka
LW
 4  Mateo Hrvatin
 14  Marko Erstić 
 22  Damir Vučko 

Line players
 8  Krešimir Kozina
 11  Mirjan Horvat
 19  Marin Sakić

Back players
LB
 3  Luka Tandara
4  Frane Bukvić
 13  Nikola Babić
 20  Marko Vidović
CB
 9  Ivan Ćosić
 10  Dalibor Prokopić
 18  Milan Kosanović
RB
 2  Luka Kovačević
 7  Milan Uzelac (captain)
 15  Marin Kružić
 19  Luka Bracanović
 20  Andrej Sekulić
Reserve players
 GK  Dino Slavić
 CB  Bruno Kozina
 LP  Marko Kačanić

Left during season
LB  Andrej Sekulić
LW  Mateo Hrvatin

Technical staff
  President: Zlatko Kolić
  Vice-president: Željko Jovanović 
  Sports director: Alvaro Načinović 
  Club secretary: Daniela Juriša
  Head Coach: Drago Žiljak 
  Assistant Coach: Marin Mišković
  Goalkeeper Coach: Igor Dokmanović
  Fitness Coach: Emil Baltić
  Fizioterapist: Branimir Maričević
  Tehniko: Williams Černeka

Competitions

Overall

Dukat Premier League

League table

Source: SportNet.hr

Matches

Source: SportNet.hr

Croatian Cup

West Region Cup - Qualifiers

Matches

Source: Hrs.hr

Friendlies

Pre-season

Memorial Robert Barbić "Beli"

Mid-season

Source: SportNet.hr

Transfers

In

Out

Source: SportNet.hr

Sources
HRS
Sport.net.hr
Rk-zamet.hr
Rijeka.hr

References

RK Zamet seasons
Handball in Croatia